Karl Kainberger (1 December 1913 – 17 December 1997) was an Austrian football (soccer) player who competed in the 1936 Summer Olympics. Kainberger was born in Salzburg. He was part of the Austrian team, which won the silver medal in the football tournament. He played two matches as forward and scored two goals. He died in Salzburg.

References

External links
 
 profile

1913 births
1997 deaths
Footballers from Salzburg
Austrian footballers
Austria international footballers
Footballers at the 1936 Summer Olympics
Olympic footballers of Austria
Olympic silver medalists for Austria
Olympic medalists in football
Medalists at the 1936 Summer Olympics
Association football forwards